La Revancha del Tango is the debut album by French musical group Gotan Project. It was released on 22 October 2001 on XL Recordings and ¡Ya Basta! Records.

The album contains a cover of the title track from Frank Zappa's 1970 album Chunga's Revenge and a cover of Gato Barbieri's theme for the 1972 film Last Tango in Paris.

Legacy
The album was included in the book 1001 Albums You Must Hear Before You Die.

Track listing
All tracks written by Philippe Cohen Solal, Christoph H. Müller and Eduardo Makaroff, except where indicated.
 "Queremos Paz" – 5:15
 "Época" – 4:28
 "Chunga's Revenge" (Frank Zappa) – 5:02
 "Tríptico" – 8:26
 "Santa María (del Buen Ayre)" – 5:57
 "Una Música Brutal" – 4:11
 "El Capitalismo Foráneo" (Solal, Müller, Avelino Flores) – 6:13
 "Last Tango in Paris" (Gato Barbieri) – 5:50
 "La del Ruso" – 6:22
 "Vuelvo al Sur" (Astor Piazzolla, Fernando E. Solanas) – 6:59

Personnel
Philippe Cohen Solal
Christoph H. Müller
Eduardo Makaroff

Certifications

References 

2001 debut albums
Gotan Project albums
XL Recordings albums